Eric Thomas Bradlow is K.P. Chao Professor, Professor of Marketing, Statistics, Education and Economics, Chairperson Wharton Marketing Department, and Vice-Dean of Analytics at the Wharton School of the University of Pennsylvania. He is known for his work on marketing research methods, missing data problems, and psychometrics. He is a fellow of the American Statistical Association and a fellow the American Education Research Association. Professor Bradlow is also co-founder of GBH Insights, a leading data-focused marketing strategy and insights firm that caters to Fortune 500 companies.

Awards
American Marketing Association, EXPLOR Award (2007)
2006 Research Committee of the Society of General Internal Medicine Best Paper Award
Inaugural Fellow of the University of Pennsylvania, (2009) 
Finalist, John D.C. Little Award (2008) for best paper in Marketing Science or Management Science
Finalist, Paul E. Green Award for the best paper in Journal of Marketing Research, 2004. 
Finalist 1997 American Statistical Association Savage Award Dissertation Prize

Books
Wainer, H., Bradlow, E.T., and Wang, X. (2007), “Testlet Response Theory and Its Applications”, Cambridge University Press, .
Bradlow, E.T., Niedermeier, K., Williams, P. (2009), “Marketing in the Financial Services Industry”, McGraw-Hill, New York.

Selected publications
Chandon, P., Hutchinson, J. W., Bradlow, E. T., & Young, S. H. (2009). Does in-store marketing work? Effects of the number and position of shelf facings on brand attention and evaluation at the point of purchase. Journal of Marketing, 73(6), 1-17.
Hui, Sam K., Eric T. Bradlow, and Peter S. Fader. "Testing behavioral hypotheses using an integrated model of grocery store shopping path and purchase behavior." Journal of consumer research 36, no. 3 (2009): 478-493.
Werner, Rachel M., and Eric T. Bradlow. "Relationship between Medicare’s hospital compare performance measures and mortality rates." Jama 296, no. 22 (2006): 2694-2702.
Park, Young-Hoon, and Eric T. Bradlow. "An integrated model for bidding behavior in Internet auctions: Whether, who, when, and how much." Journal of Marketing Research 42, no. 4 (2005): 470-482.
Bradlow, Eric T., and Peter S. Fader. "A Bayesian lifetime model for the “Hot 100” Billboard songs." Journal of the American Statistical Association 96, no. 454 (2001): 368-381.
Wainer, Howard, Eric T. Bradlow, and Zuru Du. "Testlet response theory: An analog for the 3PL model useful in testlet-based adaptive testing." In Computerized adaptive testing: Theory and practice, pp. 245–269. Springer Netherlands, 2000.
Bradlow, Eric T., Howard Wainer, and Xiaohui Wang. "A Bayesian random effects model for testlets." Psychometrika 64, no. 2 (1999): 153-168.
Hoch, Stephen J., Eric T. Bradlow, and Brian Wansink. "The variety of an assortment." Marketing Science 18, no. 4 (1999): 527-546.

References

Living people
American statisticians
Harvard University alumni
Wharton School of the University of Pennsylvania faculty
Fellows of the American Statistical Association
Year of birth missing (living people)
Quantitative psychologists